Ellen Frank may refer to:
 Ellen Frank (artist), American artist, writer, and educator
 Ellen Frank (actress) (1904–1999), German film and television actress
 Ellen Frank (scientist), American psychiatrist